This is a list of bagpipers, organized by type of bagpipes.

Historically notable bagpipers
King Edward VII, (1841–1910)
King Edward VIII, (1894–1972)
Daniel Laidlaw, (1875–1950), VC Piper to the Kings Own Scottish Borderers who received the Victoria Cross during World War I, the highest award for gallantry that can be awarded to British and Commonwealth forces

Iranian 

 Lian

Bulgarian gaidars
Kostadin Varimezov

Highland bagpipes

Northumbrian smallpipes

Scottish smallpipes 
Fred Morrison
Iain MacInnes
Brìghde Chaimbeul
Hello Goodbye

Asturian bagpipers (gaiteros) 
Hevia

Galician bagpipers (gaiteiros) 
Anxo Lorenzo
Avelino Cachafeiro
Carlos Núñez
Cristina Pato
Susana Seivane

Swedish bagpipes 
Anders Norudde
Olle Gällmo
Per Gudmundson

Uilleann pipes

Other notable bagpipers

Notable bands with nontraditional use of bagpipes

See also

Canadian pipers in World War I
List of pipe bands

References

Bagpipers